Alets IK is a Swedish football club located in Halmstad. The club is currently in Division 5.

Background

The club was established in 1923 as the Västra Boll and Idrottsföreningen, the Western Ball and Sports Club. The club was renamed Alets Idrottsklubb shortly afterwards. Alets IK was founded by Göte Streiffert, the first chairman.

Their first match was played on 21 June 1925. The team played against teams IF Gota and Furulands FF. Alets IK was greatly affected by World War II when the team struggled to find players Despite this, Alets IK was able to settle in Division 3 in 1939–40. One of the team's best seasons was 1942–43 when they finished in first place in Division 3 Sydsvenska Norra. The team was eligible for the Division 2 promotion playoffs. Next season Alets IK went one better winning their league and the promotion playoffs to advance to Division 2.

In the 1950s the team toured Germany. However, the team struggled on the pitch and were relegated. The 1960s proved to be more prosperous for the team, especially the B team. In 1968, the junior team won their league. During the 1970s, the club went through a series of different managers, a different one every year.

By the 1980s, there was a steady manager named Tommy Södergren. In 1981, the girls team were the series champions. In 1982 Eva Andersson was selected for the women's national team. In 1983 Claes "Lillis" Karlsson and Gunnar Bringman left Halmstad BK and returned to Alets after nine seasons.

By 1985 the men's team was relegated to Division 5 but the next year the team won their division. In 1986 the team advanced to Division 4 but were relegated once again to Division 5. Throughout the 1990s, the club remained in Division 4 and recruited Lillis Karlsson and Ingvar Andersson to be managers.

In 2000, the team won Division 5 Halland Södra but were relegated the following season. In 2002, the team won Division 5 again but were relegated the following year. In 2004, the team were relegated to Division 6. However, in 2005, they won Division 6 and were promoted back to Division 5. By 2009, the team were playing in Elitfyran with Niklas Andersson and Thomas Jonsson as co-managers. The B-team played in Class 2 South and placed 6th in Division 5 South.

Alets IK currently plays in Division 4 Halland which is the sixth tier of Swedish football. They play their home matches at the Alevallen in Halmstad.

The club are affiliated to the Hallands Fotbollförbund. Alets IK have competed in the Svenska Cupen on 9 occasions and have played 14 matches in the competition.

Season to season

In their early history Alets IK competed in the following divisions:

In recent seasons Alets IK have competed in the following divisions:

Attendances

In recent seasons Alets IK have had the following average attendances:

Footnotes

External links
 Alets IK – Official website
 Alets IK – Men's team website
  Alets IK Facebook

Sport in Halmstad
Football clubs in Halland County
Association football clubs established in 1923
1923 establishments in Sweden